is a Japanese former football player. He played for Japan national team.

Club career
Kato was born on 2 January 1920. After graduating from Tokyo Imperial University, he joined Tanabe Pharmaceutical in 1947.

National team career
When Kato was 31 years old, he was selected for the Japan national team in March 1951 for Japan's first international game since World War II, the 1951 Asian Games. He debuted in that competition on 9 May, against Afghanistan.

National team statistics

Honours
Japan
Asian Games Bronze medal: 1951

References

External links
 
 Japan National Football Team Database

1920 births
Possibly living people
University of Tokyo alumni
Japanese footballers
Japan international footballers
Tanabe Mitsubishi Pharma SC players
Asian Games medalists in football
Asian Games bronze medalists for Japan
Footballers at the 1951 Asian Games
Medalists at the 1951 Asian Games
Association football midfielders